Zahirabad in Iran, may refer to:
 Zahirabad-e Astaneh, Markazi Province
 Zahirabad-e Nahr Mian, Markazi Province
 Zahirabad, Razavi Khorasan
 Zahirabad, Tehran